Randol Abbey (Abbaye de Notre-Dame de Randol) is a Benedictine monastery situated at Randol near the village of Saint-Saturnin, Puy-de-Dôme department, in the Auvergne mountains of France.

It was founded in 1971 as a priory of Fontgombault Abbey and was raised to the status of an independent abbey on 21 March 1981. The monastery building was constructed at the time of foundation in a striking contemporary style in a spectacular mountainside location.

It is part of the Solesmes Congregation of the Benedictine Confederation and as such focusses on Gregorian chant and the Tridentine Mass.

Sources
Randol Abbey official website (includes many images) 

Benedictine monasteries in France
Communities using the Tridentine Mass
Buildings and structures in Puy-de-Dôme
Christian organizations established in 1971
20th-century Christian monasteries